Springdale/Davis Pond Water Aerodrome  is  southeast of Springdale, Newfoundland and Labrador on Davis Pond. It is open from June until November.

See also
Springdale Airport

References

Registered aerodromes in Newfoundland and Labrador
Seaplane bases in Newfoundland and Labrador